Suswagatham is a 1998 Indian Telugu-language romance film produced by R. B. Choudary under the Super Good Films banner, directed by Bhimaneni Srinivasa Rao. It stars Pawan Kalyan and Devayani (in her Telugu debut), with music composed by S. A. Rajkumar. The film is a remake of the Tamil movie Love Today (1997). The film was a success at the box office. Pawan Kalyan, Bhimaneni Srinivasa Rao, and R. B. Choudary later collaborated for Annavaram (2006).

Plot
Ganesh (Pawan Kalyan), a college graduate has been following a college girl, Sandhya for the past four years ,trying to express his love. Though Sandhya had often warned Ganesh not to follow her, he still does. Ganesh's friend Peter (Karan) introduces him to Sandhya's friend (Sadhika), who tries to help him with his love, but fails. Ganesh, on his birthday, tries to express his love to Sandhya, but is caught by her father, (Prakash Raj), who is a police officer, who puts him away for harassing his daughter. Later, Ganesh's father , Dr. Chandrashekhar, a reputed psychologist (Raghuvaran) bails him out.Ganesh's father and him are very close to each other as he had lost his mother in his childhood. Despite lenient, his father asks him and his friends to work and get settled. One day, Ganesh emotionally states to  his father that he badly needs Sandhya and he agrees to take the proposal.

Ganesh's father goes to Sandhya's father with a marriage proposal for him. But Sandhya's father, as usual arrogant, speaks  out of his wits and insults him. He then decides to take his daughter and his wife to his sister's house in Hyderabad,but changes his mind in the bus. But Ganesh thinks Sandhya is in Hyderabad and goes to search for her. Meanwhile, Ganesh's father dies the same day he had left, in a  road mishap  after he witnesses a boy committing suicide because his girlfriend had left him. Ganesh's friends desperately try to trace his whereabouts, but they cannot trace him. Peter ends up performing the last rites for Ganesh's father. Ganesh arrives and is  heartbroken that he could not even perform the cremation.

Sandhya now realizes her love for Ganesh. She reveals her feelings for him and tells him that she loves him and wants to spend the rest of her life with him and asks to wait at the regular bus stop. But Ganesh rejects her love and tells her that he had lost four years of his life and his father's life  for her love and says that she is not worth it. The next day, Sandhya still waits at  the bus stop, waiting for him to come.Ganesh's friends start a restaurant after his father's name and Ganesh attends the interview suggested by his father.

Cast

 Pawan Kalyan as Ganesh
 Devayani as Sandhya
 Saadhika Randhawa as Kala
 Prakash Raj as Inspector Vasu Deva Rao (Monarch)
 Raghuvaran as Dr. Chandra Shekar
 Karan as Peter
 Sudhakar as Shanmuka Sharma 
 Tirupathi Prakash as Ekbal
 Bandla Ganesh as Gaidoda
 Sudha as Krishnaveni
 Varsha as Fathema
 Y. Vijaya as Kala's mother
 Pavala Syamala
 Venu Madhav 
 Naveen as Naveen
 Madhavi Sri
 Saadhika

Production 
For the scene where his father dies, Pawan Kalyan repeatedly slapped himself to feel emotional. The shot took forty takes.

Soundtrack

Music composed by S. A. Rajkumar.

Reception 
A critic from Andhra Today opined that "For a movie with a love theme, it is an outstanding one in many ways - particularly the end which is unique. Prakash Raj`s histrionics as the sadistic father and Raghuvaran as the loving father deserve special mention".

References

External links
 

1998 films
Telugu remakes of Tamil films
1990s Telugu-language films
Indian romantic drama films
Films shot in Hyderabad, India
Films shot in Visakhapatnam
Films directed by Bhimaneni Srinivasa Rao
1998 romantic drama films